Lydia Rapoport (March 8, 1923 – September 6, 1971) was an American social worker and educator. Her contribution to crisis theory shaped treatment methodologies.

Early life and education
Lydia Rappoport was born in Vienna, Austria on March 8, 1923 to Eugenia Margulies and Samuel Rappoport. Her father emigrated to New York City in 1928, in part due to "increased antisemitism and resurgent German nationalism." Lydia stayed in Vienna with her mother and brother in Vienna while he finished high school, staying until 1932.

Rapoport attended public schools in New York City. At the age of 19 she earned a bachelor's degree in sociology from Hunter College, where she was Phi Beta Kappa. Following an accelerated graduate course, she earned her master's degree from the Smith College School for Social Work at 21 in 1944. She studied at the Harvard School of Public Health in 1959-1960 under Eric Lindemann and Gerald Caplan.

After doing casework, working with children and at the Michael Reese Hospital in Chicago, Rapoport earned a certificate in child therapy from the Chicago Institute of Psychoanalysis. She was an intake supervisor at the Child Guidance Clinic of the University of Chicago and a supervisor at the Jewish Children's Bureau. As a counselor at the Institute for Juvenile Research, she diagnosed and treated children with emotional issues. Rapoport won a Fulbright scholarship in 1952 and continued her studies at the London School of Economics.

Career
Rapoport moved to California to be near her brother, in 1954.  She began her associates with University of California, Berkeley as a field supervisor for their students before becoming a faculty member a year later and full professor in 1969.  In 1969, she established the Community Mental Health Training Program at their School of Social Welfare. She became an inter-regional adviser on family welfare and family planning for the United Nations in January 1971.

Her work is "an integral part of the foundation of current crisis intervention and crisis-oriented brief therapy. She identified the goals of crisis intervention: relief of symptoms, restoration of precrisis functioning, understanding of precipitants, and identification of remedial measures. This model continues in use today."

Rapoport died on September 6, 1971 in New York City of acute bacterial endocarditis.

Publications
Working with Families in Crisis: An Exploration in Preventive Intervention

Notes

References

1923 births
1971 deaths
Hunter College alumni
Smith College School for Social Work alumni
University of California, Berkeley School of Social Welfare faculty
Social workers
Social work scholars
Harvard School of Public Health alumni
Austrian emigrants to the United States